Yarq'asqa (Quechua yarq'a artificial canal, -sqa a suffix, "canalized", Hispanicized spelling Yarjasca) is a mountain in the Chunta mountain range in the Andes of Peru, about  high. It is located in the Huancavelica Region, Huancavelica Province, Ascensión District. Yarq'asqa lies southwest of Sitaq.

References

Mountains of Huancavelica Region
Mountains of Peru